Acrida bicolor is a grasshopper species in the Acrididae family. It is found in Africa, the Middle East, and southern Europe.

References

External links
 
 

bicolor
Insects described in 1815